Out of This World is the fourth studio album by the Swedish rock band Europe. Released on 5 August 1988 through Epic Records, the album was a commercial success selling over 3 million units worldwide, peaking at number 19 on the US Billboard 200 chart and reaching high positions in charts worldwide. It was recorded at Olympic Studios and Townhouse Studios, London, England. Out of This World is the first Europe album to feature former Easy Action and Noice guitarist Kee Marcello.

Four singles were released worldwide from the album: "Superstitious", "Open Your Heart", "Let the Good Times Rock", "More Than Meets the Eye".

Music

Songs
"Superstitious" is the first song on the album, written by Joey Tempest. It was the first single released from the album and is arguably one of Europe's most recognizable and popular songs. The song was released in Europe, Australia and New Zealand in July 1988. The song reached number one in Norway and their homeland Sweden and peaked at number 9 on the Billboard Mainstream Rock Tracks. The single charted in many other European charts as well.

"Open Your Heart" and "Let the Good Times Rock" would become minor hits in the UK. Three more singles would be released, yet none of them charted. "Sign of the Times" was released as single only in Argentina in 1988 and "Tomorrow" only in Brazil in 1989.

Release and Reception

Out of This World was the band's follow up album to the successful album The Final Countdown, but it did not match the success of its predecessor. Upon its release in August 1988, Out of This World peaked at No. 19 on the Billboard 200 album chart. The album is Europe's best-selling album in Switzerland. Out of This World achieved Platinum status in the United States,  platinum status in Switzerland and gold in Canada.

Out of This World included the hit singles "Superstitious", "Open Your Heart" and "Let the Good Times Rock", all of which had accompanying music videos. "Superstitious" was released in the fall of 1988 and became arguably the band's most recognizable song from the album. Its music video received heavy airplay on music television.

Reviewing the album, AllMusic contributor Andy Hinds writes that "Europe produces made-to-order lite metal with admirable craftsmanship and occasionally memorable hooks. "Superstitious" even has a disarming gospel quality. This is hard rock with all the edges sanded off. Capable lead singer Joey Tempest carries the tunes with nonthreatening panache, while Kee Marcello (who proved his virtuosity on Europe's previous by performing "Flight of the Bumblebee") provides plenty of nice guitar solos." Paul Elliott of Classic Rock considers Out of This World "the strongest" of the two follow-up albums to the highly successful The Final Countdown and "Superstitious" "arguably Europe's greatest ever song". Tim Jones of Record Collector is even more enthusiastic, defining the album "a stratospheric set of a dozen imperious rockers." On the contrary, Canadian journalist Martin Popoff wrote a bad review of the album, comparing it to "an offensive pop rock outing, much closer to early Warrant ... than The Final Countdown could or would dare" and calling Europe "a dunce-cap posse solidly in search of cash and chicks, egregiously removed from any sort of hard rock acumen."

Out of This World Tour

Prior to the release of the album, in the summer of 1988, the band travelled the U.S. together with Def Leppard. However, the band's management considered a promotional tour of Europe (the continent) more important and made the band withdraw from the highly successful American tour. It has been reported that manager Thomas Erdtman made the decision as he did not want to share more US revenues with American manager Herbie Herbert as this was agreed in a contract.

After the promotional tour was over, the band set on rehearsing for the upcoming Out Of This World Tour, which began with a bombastic show (60,000 visitors) in Mumbai, India in November 1988. Then the band flew to Japan, where they filmed the video for "Let the Good Times Rock". The scheduled tour of Australia was, however, unexpectedly cancelled. From January to April 1989, the band toured all over Europe. In some places, in Germany particularly, the band did not manage to fill up the arenas and concert halls like they had done during the Final Countdown Tour, despite more and more good reviews from the musical press. In May 1989 the band was supposed to go over to the USA again. But the album sales were not as high as had been expected. So in the end, there was no U.S. tour and the only concert the band played in the summer of 1989 was the legendary festival in Milton Keynes (UK). After that, the band decided to move to Los Angeles and compose new songs for the next album.

Track listing

Interviews with the band from before and around the album's release indicate that a title track and a cover song were recorded but not included. Kee Marcello claims in his biography The Rock Star that God Forgot to have written a number of complete songs that were rejected for this album - "Too Far Gone", "Another World" and "Can't Fake Love" are listed. He also clarifies that the "cover song" was in fact a Diane Warren demo called "Look Away", a Billboard No. 1 hit for the band Chicago in December 1988.

Personnel

Europe
Joey Tempest  – vocals, rhythm guitar, piano on "Tomorrow"
Kee Marcello – guitar, backing vocals
John Levén  – bass guitar
Mic Michaeli – keyboards, backing vocals
Ian Haugland – drums, backing vocals

Additional musicians
Keith Murrell –  backing vocals on "Coast to Coast" and "Just the Beginning"
Mike Moran –  conductor, string arrangements

Production
Ron Nevison  – producer, engineer, mixing
Paul Hume –  engineer, string engineer
Rob Bozas, Andy Bradfield, Heidi Cannavo –  assistant engineers
Mats Grahn –  multitechnician (bass, guitar, and keyboard technician)
Paul Jamieson –  drum technician
Bernard Maisner –  hand lettering
Lynn Goldsmith –  photography
Joel Zimmerman –  art direction

Charts

Album

Singles

Sales and certifications

References 

Europe (band) albums
1988 albums
Epic Records albums
Albums produced by Ron Nevison
Albums recorded at Olympic Sound Studios